Make it Happen is the debut studio EP from the American rock band Rock N Roll Hi Fives.

Content
The six-track EP was self-released as a digital download, on 15 September 2014. It was written between 2013 and 2014, engineered, recorded and mixed by Mike Moebius at Moonlight Mile Recordings in Jersey City, New Jersey, and mastered by Joe Lambert at Joe Lambert Mastering in Brooklyn, New York City. The band describe it as "one part Raspberries, one part A.C. Newman, like Harry Nilsson filtered through Weezer with a dash of Superchunk mixed in for high-energy measure, and of course a good dosage of Guided by Voices."

Reception
Tris McCall describes Make it Happen as "major-chord punk, catchy singalong choruses that arrive punctually." He calls his favorite song "Come Around," noting "in a moment of clarity, on [the song], she's already decided she's going to be a nonconformist[,] and if you listen close enough, you can hear her weighing the pleasures against the perils." Jim Appio of CoolDad Music writes Make it Happen is "not just a record for kids. It is a really good indie pop record that draws on influences from the 1960s to classic indie/alt rock[.] The songs all feature the positive message generally associated with Family Music, but they don't deal in kids-only subject matter. There are some messages, in fact, that everyone should take to heart[.] The Rock n Roll Hi Fives lead by example."

Tracklisting

Personnel
Eilee Centeno – vocals
Evren Centeno – drums
Gloree Centeno –  bass
Joe Centeno – guitars and backing vocals

References
Citations

Bibliography

2014 EPs
Rock-and-roll albums
Rock N Roll Hi Fives albums